Jordi Fabregat Valmaña (born 4 December 1961) is a Spanish retired footballer who played as a defender, and is a current manager.

Club career
Born in Tortosa, Tarragona, Catalonia, Fabregat made his senior debuts with CD Tortosa, aged only 16, in the regional leagues. After appearing with Terrassa FC in Segunda División B, he joined Hércules CF in the 1982 summer.

With the Valencian he was promoted to La Liga in the 1983–84 campaign, appearing in 33 matches and scoring two goals. He made his top flight debut on 2 September 1984, starting in a 1–0 away win against Real Zaragoza.

In the 1986 summer, after falling down the pecking order, Fabregat moved to Córdoba CF also in the third level. After appearing regularly for the Andalusians he signed for Segunda División club Xerez CD in the following year, and appeared regularly during his four-year spell.

In 1991 Fabregat joined Yeclano CF in the third division. He eventually retired with CD San Fernando in 1994, playing his last season in Tercera División.

Manager career
In 1997 Fabregat returned to his first club Tortosa, now as manager. He subsequently manager CF La Senia, AD Mar Menor-San Javier and CF Amposta before being appointed at the helm of Racing Club Portuense on 29 January 2009.

After failing to avoid relegation, Fabregat was sacked and joined UE Rapitenca on 9 October. In November 2010 he returned to Amposta, and after establishing the club in the fourth level, was appointed UB Conquense manager on 1 August 2012.

References

External links

1961 births
Living people
People from Tortosa
Sportspeople from the Province of Tarragona
Spanish footballers
Footballers from Catalonia
Association football defenders
La Liga players
Segunda División players
Segunda División B players
Tercera División players
Terrassa FC footballers
Hércules CF players
Córdoba CF players
Xerez CD footballers
CD San Fernando players
Spain youth international footballers
Spain under-21 international footballers
Spanish football managers
UB Conquense managers
CD Guijuelo managers
FC Jumilla managers
Yeclano CF players